Émile Andrieu (1 February 1881 – 5 May 1955) was a Belgian footballer. He played in 18 matches for the Belgium national football team from 1905 to 1913.

References

External links
 

1881 births
1955 deaths
Belgian footballers
Belgium international footballers
Place of birth missing
Association football defenders